Ismail Mohamed is an American politician who is the representative for Ohio House District 3. He won the primary on August 2, 2022 and won in the November 2022 general election. He and Munira Abdullahi are the first two Somali American representatives in Ohio.

References

External links

Living people
Year of birth missing (living people)
American politicians of Somalian descent
21st-century African-American politicians
21st-century American politicians
American Muslims
Politicians from Columbus, Ohio
Ohio State University alumni
Ohio Democrats